Harry Beaumont (10 February 1888 – 22 December 1966) was an American film director, actor, and screenwriter. He worked for a variety of production companies including Fox, Goldwyn, Metro, Warner Brothers, and Metro-Goldwyn-Mayer.

Career
Beaumont's greatest successes were during the silent film era, when he directed films including John Barrymore's Beau Brummel (1924) and the silent youth movie Our Dancing Daughters (1928), featuring Joan Crawford. He then directed MGM's first talkie musical, The Broadway Melody (1929). The latter film won the Best Picture Academy Award that year, and Beaumont was nominated for Best Director.

Personal life and death
Beaumont was married to actress Hazel Daly. The couple had twin daughters Anne and Geraldine, born in 1922.

On 22 December 1966, Beaumont died at St. John's Hospital in Santa Monica, California. His gravesite is at Forest Lawn Memorial Park, Glendale.

Filmography

Director

 The Truant Soul (1916)
 Skinner's Dress Suit (1917)
 Burning the Candle (1917)
 Skinner's Bubble (1917)
 Filling His Own Shoes (1917)
 Skinner's Baby (1917)
 Go West, Young Man (1918)
 Thirty a Week (1918)
 Brown of Harvard (1918)
 A Wild Goose Chase (1919)
The Little Rowdy (1919)
 One of the Finest (1919)
 Heartsease (1919)
 A Man and His Money (1919)
 The City of Comrades (1919)
 The Gay Lord Quex (1919)
 Lord and Lady Algy (1919)
 Toby's Bow (1919)
 Dollars and Sense (1920)
 The Great Accident (1920)
 Going Some (1920)
 Stop Thief! (1920)
 The Fourteenth Man (1922)
 June Madness (1922)
 The Five Dollar Baby (1922)
 The Ragged Heiress (1922)
 They Like 'Em Rough (1922)
 Love in the Dark (1922)
 Seeing's Believing (1922)
 Glass Houses (1922)
 Very Truly Yours (1922)
 Lights of the Desert (1922)
 Crinoline and Romance (1923)
 Main Street (1923)
 A Noise in Newboro (1923)
 The Gold Diggers (1923)
 Beau Brummel (1924)
 Babbitt (1924)
 The Lover of Camille (1924)
 Don't Doubt Your Husband (1924)
 A Lost Lady (1924)
 His Majesty, Bunker Bean (1925)
 Rose of the World (1925)
 Recompense (1925)
 Sandy (1926)
 Womanpower (1926)
 One Increasing Purpose (1927)
 Forbidden Hours (1928)
 Our Dancing Daughters (1928)
 A Single Man (1929)
 The Broadway Melody (1929)
 Speedway (1929)
 Great Day (1930)
 Our Blushing Brides (1930)
 The Florodora Girl (1930)
 Children of Pleasure (1930)
 Lord Byron of Broadway (1930)
 Those Three French Girls (1930)
 Dance, Fools, Dance (1931)
 Laughing Sinners (1931)
 The Great Lover (1931)
 West of Broadway (1931)
 Faithless (1932)
 Are You Listening? (1932)
 Unashamed (1932)
 Made on Broadway (1933)
 Should Ladies Behave (1933)
 When Ladies Meet (1933)
 Murder in the Private Car (1934)
 Enchanted April (1935)
 The Girl on the Front Page (1936)
 When's Your Birthday? (1937)
 Maisie Goes to Reno (1944)
 Twice Blessed (1945)
 Up Goes Maisie (1946)
 The Show-Off (1946)
 Undercover Maisie (1947)
 Alias a Gentleman (1948)

Writer
 Burning the Candle (1917)
 Filling His Own Shoes (1917)
 Brown of Harvard (1918)
 The Little Rowdy (1919)
 June Madness (1922)

References

External links

 
 

1888 births
1966 deaths
20th-century American male actors
Male actors from Kansas
American film producers
American male silent film actors
American male screenwriters
Burials at Forest Lawn Memorial Park (Glendale)
People from Abilene, Kansas
Silent film directors
Film directors from Kansas
Screenwriters from Kansas
20th-century American male writers
20th-century American screenwriters